Jerrod Sanders (born October 1, 1979) is an American mixed martial artist. He has competed in the bantamweight, featherweight and lightweight divisions.

Mixed martial arts career

Early career
Sanders made his professional MMA debut in March 2010.  He fought for a variety of promotions including Bellator MMA and World Series of Fighting.  In the first four years of his career he amassed a record of 14 wins against 1 loss.

Ultimate Fighting Championship
Sanders made his UFC debut against Yosdenis Cedeno on July 16, 2014 at UFC Fight Night 45.  He lost the fight via TKO after the first round as Sanders was unable to continue.

Sanders next faced Pedro Munhoz on October 4, 2014 at UFC Fight Night: MacDonald vs. Saffiedine. He lost the fight via submission in the first round. Subsequently, Munhoz tested positive for exogenous origin of testosterone metabolites and the result was changed to a no contest.

In his third fight for the promotion, Sanders fought Russell Doane on July 12, 2015 at The Ultimate Fighter 21 Finale. He won the fight via unanimous decision.

Sanders next faced Felipe Arantes on July 7, 2016 at UFC Fight Night 90. He lost the fight via submission in the second round.

Mixed martial arts record

|-
|Loss
|align=center|16–4 (1)
|Anselmo Luis Luna Jr.
|Decision (split)
|C3 Fights 46 - Clash at the Council
|
|align=center|3
|align=center|5:00
|Newkirk, Oklahoma, United States
| 
|-
|Win
|align=center|16–3 (1)
|Chris Gutiérrez
|Decision (unanimous)
|C3 Fights - Fight Night
|
|align=center|3
|align=center|5:00
|Newkirk, Oklahoma, United States
| 
|-
|Loss
|align=center|15–3 (1)
|Felipe Arantes
|Submission (armbar)
|UFC Fight Night: dos Anjos vs. Alvarez
|
|align=center|2
|align=center|1:39
|Las Vegas, Nevada, United States
| 
|-
| Win
| align=center| 15–2 (1)
| Russell Doane
| Decision (unanimous)
| The Ultimate Fighter: American Top Team vs. Blackzilians Finale 
| 
| align=center| 3
| align=center| 5:00
| Las Vegas, Nevada, United States
|
|-
| NC
| align=center| 14–2 (1)
| Pedro Munhoz
| NC (overturned)
| UFC Fight Night: MacDonald vs. Saffiedine
| 
| align=center| 1
| align=center| 0:39
| Halifax, Nova Scotia, Canada
| 
|-
| Loss
| align=center| 14–2
| Yosdenis Cedeno
| TKO (retirement)
| UFC Fight Night: Cowboy vs. Miller
| 
| align=center| 1
| align=center| 5:00
| Atlantic City, New Jersey, United States
| 
|-
| Win
| align=center| 14–1
| Thomas Schulte
| Decision (unanimous)
| SCS 21: No Surrender
| 
| align=center| 3
| align=center| 5:00
| Hinton, Oklahoma, United States
| 
|-
| Win
| align=center| 13–1
| Jeff Smith
| Decision (unanimous)
| WSOF 3
| 
| align=center| 3
| align=center| 5:00
| Las Vegas, Nevada, United States
|
|-
| Win
| align=center| 12–1
| Rocky Long
| TKO (punches)
| SCS 12: Red, White, Black and Blue
| 
| align=center| 1
| align=center| 4:08
| Hinton, Oklahoma, United States
| 
|-
| Win
| align=center| 11–1
| Derek Cranford
| Submission (arm-triangle choke)
| KOTC: Thunderstorm
| 
| align=center| 1
| align=center| 2:37
| Norman, Oklahoma, United States
| 
|-
| Win
| align=center| 10–1
| Willian Teixeira
| Submission (D'Arce choke)
| HCC 10: Haidar Capixaba Combat 10
| 
| align=center| 1
| align=center| 2:41
| Vitória, Brazil
| 
|-
| Win
| align=center| 9–1
| Andrew Carrillo
| Submission (choke)
| SCS 9: Sugar Creek Showdown 9
| 
| align=center| 1
| align=center| 4:32
| Hinton, Oklahoma, United States
| 
|-
| Win
| align=center| 8–1
| Dustin Blake
| Decision (unanimous)
| C3 Fights: Slamfest
| 
| align=center| 3
| align=center| 5:00
| Newkirk, Oklahoma, United States
| 
|-
| Win
| align=center| 7–1
| Willie Mack
| Decision (unanimous)
| C3 Fights: Fall Brawl
| 
| align=center| 3
| align=center| 3:00
| Newkirk, Oklahoma, United States
| 
|-
| Win
| align=center| 6–1
| Jimmy Van Horn
| TKO (punches)
| SCS 7: Sugar Creek Showdown 7
| 
| align=center| 4
| align=center| 3:44
| Hinton, Oklahoma, United States
| 
|-
| Win
| align=center| 5–1
| Cody Carrillo
| Submission (D'Arce choke)
| C3 Fights: Great Plains Sizzling Slamfest
| 
| align=center| 3
| align=center| 1:42
| Newkirk, Oklahoma, United States
| 
|-
| Win
| align=center| 4–1
| Rick Huff
| Submission (rear-naked choke)
| C3 Fights: MMA Championship Fights
| 
| align=center| 1
| align=center| 0:58
| Concho, Oklahoma, United States
| 
|-
| Win
| align=center| 3–1
| Javier Obregon
| Decision (unanimous)
| SCS 5: Sugar Creek Showdown 5
| 
| align=center| 3
| align=center| 5:00
| Hinton, Oklahoma, United States
| 
|-
| Loss
| align=center| 2–1
| Jeremy Spoon
| Submission (rear-naked choke)
| Bellator 37
| 
| align=center| 2
| align=center| 0:26
| Concho, Oklahoma, United States
| 
|-
| Win
| align=center| 2–0
| William Joplin
| Decision (unanimous)
| C3 Fights: SlamFest
| 
| align=center| 3
| align=center| 5:00
| Newkirk, Oklahoma, United States
| 
|-
| Win
| align=center| 1–0
| Anthony Christodoulou
| Submission (D'Arce choke)
| Fury Fight Promotions: The Storm
| 
| align=center| 2
| align=center| 2:14
| North Charleston, South Carolina, United States
|

Mixed martial arts amateur record

|-
| Win
| align=center| 1–0
| Robert Abrantes
| Submission (rear-naked choke)
| CFP: Clash at the Coast 3
| 
| align=center| 1
| align=center| 1:57
| Wilmington, North Carolina, United States
|

See also
List of male mixed martial artists

References

External links
 
 
 
 Jerrod Sanders at MMAjunkie.com
 Jerrod Sanders at GoPack.com (NC State Wolfpack)
 Waianae's Russell Doane to fight Jerrod Sanders in July UFC event at Honolulu Star-Advertiser
 

1979 births
Living people
American male mixed martial artists
Bantamweight mixed martial artists
Featherweight mixed martial artists
Lightweight mixed martial artists
Mixed martial artists utilizing collegiate wrestling
Mixed martial artists utilizing Brazilian jiu-jitsu
People from El Reno, Oklahoma
Mixed martial artists from Oklahoma
Ultimate Fighting Championship male fighters
American male sport wrestlers
American practitioners of Brazilian jiu-jitsu